Achnatherum latiglume is a species of grass known by the common names wide-glumed needlegrass, Sierra needlegrass.

Its current classification by the Jepson Herbarium is Stipa latiglumis.

The bunchgrass is endemic to montane California, where it grows in the mountain meadows and pine forests of the Sierra Nevada, and in a few areas of the Transverse Ranges to the southwest.

Description
Achnatherum latiglume is a perennial bunchgrass forming tight bunches of erect stems up to 110 centimeters tall. It has hairlike leaves under 3 millimeters wide.

The inflorescence is up to about 30 centimeters long. Each hairy spikelet is just over a centimeter long and sharply pointed, with an awn about 4 centimeters long and kinked twice.

References

External links
Calflora Database: Stipa latiglumis (Wide-glumed needle grass)
Jepson eFlora (TJM2) treatment of Stipa latiglumis
USDA Plants Profile for Achnatherum latiglume (Sierra needlegrass)
Grass Manual Treatment
Stipa latiglumis — UC Photos gallery

latiglumis
Native grasses of California
Endemic flora of California
Flora of the Sierra Nevada (United States)
Natural history of the Transverse Ranges